Winston Mutulasoni Mhango (born 28 August 1988) is a Zimbabwean footballer who plays as a midfielder for Kabwe Warriors. He has been capped twice for the Zimbabwe national football team.

References

1988 births
Living people
Zimbabwe Premier Soccer League players
Zimbabwean footballers
Hwange Colliery F.C. players
F.C. Platinum players
Kabwe Warriors F.C. players
Zimbabwe international footballers
Association football midfielders
People from Matabeleland North Province
Zimbabwean expatriate footballers
Expatriate footballers in Zambia
Zimbabwean expatriate sportspeople in Zambia